Angela Au Man-sze (born 25 January 1983) is a Hong Kong singer and radio disk/web jockey. A former member of the cantopop group, Cookies, she had previously been a student and part-time model.

She entered a singing contest held by Yes!/EMI to enter Cookies, then left Cookies and entered Radio Television Hong Kong (RTHK radio 2) in 2003.

The online platform Teen Power (under RTHK) was established in 2004, and she has been a Web J since then. She still acts and sings on occasions as well as emceeing various functions.

Programs hosting

RTHK Radio 2
(2004– ) Hip Hop Angel Angela ( Sun 15: 00 – 16: 00 )
(2008– ) Made in Hong Kong (Daily 13: 00 – 15: 00)

Teen Power
(2007– ) [video] Music Drive ( Can-Drive )

Programs hosted

RTHK Radio 2

Teen Power

Programs participated in

RTHK Radio 2

Teen Power

RTHK Podcast Station

Songs

Dramas

Films

TV programs

Audio dramas

Web dramas

Commercials
(2000) HutchIDD0080
(2002) Meko
(2002) Sun Flower (Dubai)
(2002) 2% fashion boutique
(2007) Pink Magic (Tai Wan)

External links
Official blogsite
Angela Au Man-sze Place Forum

1983 births
Cookies (group) members
21st-century Hong Kong actresses
Hong Kong radio presenters
Living people
21st-century Hong Kong women singers